Bonney is an electoral district of the Legislative Assembly in the Australian state of Queensland. It was created in the 2017 redistribution and was first contested in the 2017 Queensland state election. It was named after pioneer aviator Maude Bonney.

Located on the Gold Coast, Bonney consists of the suburbs of Biggera Waters, Arundel, Parkwood, Labrador and the northern area of Southport.

Members for Bonney

Election results

See also
 Electoral districts of Queensland
 Members of the Queensland Legislative Assembly by year
 :Category:Members of the Queensland Legislative Assembly by name

References

Electoral districts of Queensland